Philadelphus × lemoinei is a shrub in the genus Philadelphus. In 1884, Victor Lemoine crossed Philadelphus microphyllus with Philadelphus coronarius and produced this hybrid plant which he named P. lemoinei. The following cultivars have gained the Royal Horticultural Society's Award of Garden Merit:-

Philadelphus 'Manteau d'Hermine'
Philadelphus 'Belle Étoile'

References
Arnold Arboretum Bulletin of Popular Information, vol VI no. 10, June 24, 1920.
Arnold Arboretum Bulletin of Popular Information, vol XXV no. 5, June 18, 1965.

External links

lemoinei
Hybrid plants